Grallenia is a genus of fish in the family Gobiidae native to the western Pacific Ocean.

Species
There are currently 8 recognized species in this genus:
 Grallenia arenicola Shibukawa & Iwata, 2007
 Grallenia baliensis G. R. Allen & Erdmann, 2012 (Bali goby) 
 Grallenia compta G. R. Allen & Erdmann, 2017 (Ornamented goby) 
 Grallenia dimorpha G. R. Allen & Erdmann, 2017 (Dimorphic goby) 
 Grallenia lauensis G. R. Allen & Erdmann, 2017 (Lau goby) 
 Grallenia lipi Shibukawa & Iwata, 2007 (Filamented pygmy sand-goby)
 Grallenia rubrilineata G. R. Allen & Erdmann, 2017 (Red-stripe goby) 
 Grallenia solomonensis G. R. Allen & Erdmann, 2017 (Solomons goby)

References

Gobiidae